is a Japanese footballer  who plays as a right back for Kashiwa Reysol.

Club career 
A product of Albirex Niigata academy. Kawaguchi joined the Albirex at the age of 15 and has been used in both midfield and offensive positions while progressing through the ranks at the club. He made his first team debut in the Emperor's Cup match against Saurcos Fukui in September 2012, and provided the cross for a Bruno Lopes goal. He signed a professional contract in October 2012 following the completion of his scholarship. He made his J. League debut on 27 April 2013, in a 3–2 defeat to Kashima Antlers.

National team career
In June 2011, Kawaguchi was elected Japan U-17 national team for 2011 U-17 World Cup and he played 4 matches as right side-back.

Club career statistics
Last updated: end of 2018 season.

References

External links 
 
 
 

1994 births
Living people
Association football people from Niigata Prefecture
Japanese footballers
Japan youth international footballers
J1 League players
J2 League players
J3 League players
Albirex Niigata players
Shimizu S-Pulse players
Kashiwa Reysol players
J.League U-22 Selection players
Association football defenders